Vasilkova is a female form of Russian (Василькова) and Belarus (Васількова) surname Vasilkov. Notable people with the surname include:

 Elvira Vasilkova (born 1962), Belarusian swimmer
 Maria Vasilkova (born 1978), Russian politician

See also
 Vasilkovo